The Oceania Squash Federation (OSF) was set up in 1992 regulates squash throughout Oceania.

It is based in Wanguri, Northern Territory in Australia. As of 2012 it has 12 member federations

List of members

See also
 2015 Pacific Games

References

External links
 Oceania Squash Federation Official Website

Squash organizations
Squash in Oceania
Sports governing bodies in Oceania
World Squash Federation
Sports organizations established in 1992
1992 establishments in Australia